Anders Järryd was the defending champion, but decided to rest in order to compete at the Davis Cup the following week.

Ricki Osterthun won the title by defeating Kent Carlsson 4–6, 4–6, 6–4, 6–2, 6–3 in the final. The match was briefly interrupted by rain after the end of the third set.

Seeds

Draw

Finals

Top half

Bottom half

References

External links
 Official results archive (ATP)
 Official results archive (ITF)

Dutch Open (tennis)
1985 Grand Prix (tennis)